Jusztin Nándor Takács (15 January 1927 – 11 July 2016) was a Hungarian Catholic prelate and Carmelite friar. He was born in Rábacsanak, Hungary. He served as the Bishop of Székesfehérvár from 1991 until his retirement in 2003.

Takács died on 11 July 2016 from an extended illness in Székesfehérvár, Hungary, aged 89.

References

External links

 Bishop Jusztin Nándor Takács, O.C.D. 

1927 births
2016 deaths
21st-century Roman Catholic bishops in Hungary
Carmelite bishops
People from Győr-Moson-Sopron County
20th-century Roman Catholic bishops in Hungary